Kornblumenblau is a 1989 Polish drama film directed by Leszek Wosiewicz. The film was selected as the Polish entry for the Best Foreign Language Film at the 62nd Academy Awards, but was not accepted as a nominee.

Cast
 Adam Kamień as Tadeusz
 Marcin Troński as Moskwa
 Piotr Skiba as Włodek
 Krzysztof Kolberger as Blokowy
 Wiesław Wójcik as Blokowy
 Marek Chodorowski as Szef
 Zygmunt Bielawski as Blokowy
 Ewa Błaszczyk as Komendantowa
 Erwin Nowiaszek as Szef
 Jerzy Rogulski as Strażnik

See also
 List of submissions to the 62nd Academy Awards for Best Foreign Language Film
 List of Polish submissions for the Academy Award for Best Foreign Language Film

References

External links
 

1989 films
1989 drama films
Polish drama films
1980s Polish-language films